Excalibur is a 1981 epic medieval fantasy film directed, co-written and produced by John Boorman, that retells the legend of King Arthur and the knights of the Round Table, based loosely on the 15th-century Arthurian romance Le Morte d'Arthur by Thomas Malory. It stars Nigel Terry as Arthur, Nicol Williamson as Merlin, Nicholas Clay as Lancelot, Cherie Lunghi as Guenevere, Helen Mirren as Morgana, Liam Neeson as Gawain, Gabriel Byrne as Uther and Patrick Stewart as Leondegrance. The film is named after the legendary sword of King Arthur that features prominently in Arthurian literature. The film's soundtrack features the music of Richard Wagner and Carl Orff, along with an original score by Trevor Jones.

Boorman's Excalibur began development as an unproduced adaptation of The Lord of the Rings. The film was shot entirely on location in Ireland and at Ardmore Studios, employing Irish actors and crew. It has been acknowledged for its importance to the Irish filmmaking industry and for helping launch the film and acting careers of a number of Irish and British actors, including Liam Neeson, Patrick Stewart, Gabriel Byrne and Ciarán Hinds.

Film critics Roger Ebert and Vincent Canby criticized the film's plot and characters, although they and other reviewers praised its visual style. Excalibur opened at number one in the United States, eventually grossing $34,967,437 on a budget of around US$11 million to rank 18th in that year's receipts. It won the award for Best Artistic Contribution at the 1981 Cannes Film Festival, and received an Oscar nomination for Best Cinematography and a BAFTA nomination for Best Costume Design.

Plot

In the Dark Ages, the sorcerer Merlin retrieves the magical sword Excalibur from the Lady of the Lake for Uther Pendragon. Merlin also agrees to help Uther seduce Igrayne, the Duke of Cornwall's wife, in exchange for “what issues from your lust". With Merlin's magic, Uther tricks Igrayne into sleeping with him while Cornwall dies in battle. Her daughter Morgana, however, sees through Uther's illusion. Nine months later, Igrayne gives birth to Arthur, and Merlin comes for the boy. Furious, Uther chases after Merlin, but gets ambushed by Cornwall's surviving men. Before dying, Uther thrusts Excalibur into a large stone. Merlin declares that he who pulls the sword from the stone shall be king.

Years later, Arthur pulls Excalibur from the stone, proving he is Uther's son, the rightful ruler. Arthur's bravery and prowess at combat make him earn the trust of knights Leodegrance and Uryens, who swear fealty to the young king. During this time, Arthur also meets Guinevere and is smitten by her.

Later, the undefeated knight Lancelot blocks a bridge, seeking a king worthy of his sword. He defeats the king's knights and gets challenged by Arthur to a fight. With the aid of Excalibur and the Lady of the Lake, Arthur is victorious, and Lancelot swears allegiance to him. Arthur and his knights unify the land. Arthur creates the Round Table, commissions the building of his castle Camelot and marries Guinevere. Meanwhile, his half-sister Morgana becomes apprenticed to Merlin.

Influenced by Morgana's magic, Gawain accuses Guinevere of treachery and a duel over her innocence is set. While Arthur is judge of the trial, Lancelot fights for her honour and wins. Guinevere is moved by this and the two make love. Arthur finds out about it and spitefully thrusts Excalibur into the ground between them. Merlin's magical link to the land impales him on the sword, and Morgana seizes the opportunity to trap him and steal his secret Charm of Making. Taking the form of Guinevere, she seduces the unknowing Arthur.

She later births a son, Mordred, whose incestuous origin strikes the land with famine and sickness. Struck by a magical bolt of lightning, Arthur is reduced to a weakened state. He sends his knights on a quest for the Holy Grail in hopes of restoring the land and himself. While searching, many knights die or are bewitched by Morgana into entering her service. After reaching adulthood, Mordred demands Arthur's crown, to no avail. Before coldly rebuking Arthur's attempt to recognize him as his son, Mordred vows to return with an army and take Camelot by force.

Perceval resists Morgana's attacks and, before long, he is the final remaining knight questing for the Grail. Along the way, he nearly drowns and is transported to where the Grail is kept. He proves worthy, gains the Grail and takes it back to Arthur, who drinks from it and is revitalized, along with the land. Arthur calls upon his step-brother Kay to rally his remaining forces to battle Mordred and Morgana.

Arthur finds Guinevere at a convent, and they reconcile. She gives him back Excalibur, which she had kept, and he rides off with his men. At Stonehenge, Arthur falls asleep, and his love liberates Merlin from Morgana's magical prison. After a final conversation with Arthur, Merlin appears to Morgana and tricks her into speaking the Charm of Making. This exhausts her magical powers and summons a mist that envelops her camp and the battlefield. Mordred discovers her aged, true self and murders her in disgust.

Arthur and his men wage war on Mordred's forces, using the mist in their favour. During the battle, Lancelot arrives, reconciles with Arthur and dies fighting. Arthur manages to kill Mordred, but the fight leaves him mortally wounded. While slowly dying, he commands Perceval, the only other survivor, to throw Excalibur into a lake, knowing that one day the sword will rise again when a worthy king comes to power. Perceval complies, and the Lady of the Lake catches the sword, dragging it into the depths. Perceval returns to the battlefield in time to glimpse Arthur being carried away on a ship, sailing towards his rest on Avalon.

Cast

 Nigel Terry as Arthur
 Helen Mirren as Morgana Le Fay
 Kay McLaren as the aged Morgana
 Barbara Byrne as the young Morgana
 Nicholas Clay as Sir Lancelot
 Cherie Lunghi as Guenevere
 Paul Geoffrey as Perceval
 Nicol Williamson as Merlin
 Corin Redgrave as Duke of Cornwall
 Patrick Stewart as King Leodegrance
 Keith Buckley as Uryens
 Clive Swift as Ector
 Liam Neeson as Gawain
 Gabriel Byrne as King Uther Pendragon
 Robert Addie as Prince Mordred
 Charley Boorman as young Mordred
 Katrine Boorman as Igrayne
 Ciarán Hinds as King Lot
 Niall O'Brien as Sir Kay
 Mannix Flynn as Mordred’s Lieutenant
 Brid Brennan as Lady-in-Waiting
 Eamon Kelly as Abbot
 Hilary Joyalle as Lady of the Lake

Production

Development

John Boorman had planned a film adaptation of the Merlin legend as early as 1969, but when submitting the three-hour script written with Rospo Pallenberg to United Artists, they rejected it deeming it too costly and offered him J. R. R. Tolkien's The Lord of the Rings instead. Boorman was allowed to shop the script elsewhere, but no studio would commit to it. Returning to his original idea of the Merlin legend, Boorman was eventually able to secure deals that would help him do Excalibur. Much of the imagery and set designs were created with his The Lord of the Rings project in mind, and it has been noted that certain scenes are reminiscent of Monty Python's 1975 comedy film, Monty Python and the Holy Grail.

Writing
Rospo Pallenberg and John Boorman wrote the screenplay, which is primarily an adaptation of Malory's Morte d'Arthur (1469–70) recasting the Arthurian legends as an allegory of the cycle of birth, life, decay, and restoration, by stripping the text of decorative or insignificant details. The resulting film is reminiscent of mythographic works such as Sir James Frazer's The Golden Bough and Jessie Weston's From Ritual to Romance; Arthur is presented as the "Wounded King" whose realm becomes a wasteland to be reborn thanks to the Grail, and may be compared to the Fisher (or Sinner) King, whose land also became a wasteland, and was also healed by Perceval. "The film has to do with mythical truth, not historical truth," Boorman remarked to a journalist during filming. The Christian symbolism revolves around the Grail, perhaps most strongly in the baptismal imagery of Perceval finally achieving the Grail quest.  "That's what my story is about: the coming of Christian man and the disappearance of the old religions which are represented by Merlin. The forces of superstition and magic are swallowed up into the unconscious."

In addition to Malory, the writers incorporated elements from other Arthurian stories, sometimes altering them. For example, the sword between the sleeping lovers' bodies comes from the tales of Tristan and Iseult; the knight who returns Excalibur to the water is changed from Bedivere to Perceval; and Morgause and Morgan Le Fay are merged into one character. The sword Excalibur and the Sword in the Stone are presented as the same thing; in some versions of the legends, they are separate. In Le Morte d'Arthur, Sir Galahad, the illegitimate son of Lancelot and Elaine of Carbone, is the Knight who is worthy of the Holy Grail. Boorman follows the earlier version of the tale as told by Chrétien de Troyes, making Perceval the grail winner. Some new elements were added, such as Uther wielding Excalibur before Arthur (repeated in Merlin), Merlin's 'Charm of Making' (written in Old Irish), and the concept of the world as "the dragon" (probably inspired by the dragon omen seen in Geoffrey of Monmouth's account of Merlin's life).

The Charm of Making
According to linguist Michael Everson, the "Charm of Making" that Merlin speaks to invoke the dragon is an invention, there being no attested source for the charm. Everson reconstructs the text as Old Irish. Although the pronunciation in the film has little relation to how the text would actually be pronounced in Irish, the most likely interpretation of the spoken words, as Old Irish text is:

Anál nathrach,
orth’ bháis's bethad,
do chél dénmha

In modern English, this can be translated as:

 Serpent's breath,
 the charm of death and life,
 thy omen of making.

Casting
Boorman cast Nicol Williamson and Helen Mirren opposite each other as Merlin and Morgana, knowing that the two were on less than friendly terms due to personal issues that arose during a production of Macbeth seven years earlier. Boorman verified this on the Excalibur DVD commentary, saying he felt that the tension on the set would come through in the actors' performances.

Even though he was 35 years old, Nigel Terry plays King Arthur from his teenage years to his ending as an aged monarch.

Several members of the Boorman family appear in the cast: his daughter Katrine played Igraine, Arthur's mother, and his son Charley portrayed Mordred as a boy. Because of the number of Boormans involved with the film, it is sometimes called "The Boorman Family Project".

Filming

Excalibur was filmed on-location in County Wicklow, County Tipperary, and County Kerry, with the interiors shot at Ardmore Studios. The costumes were designed by Bob Ringwood. The armor was designed by Terry English.

An early critical battle scene at a castle, in which Arthur is made a knight by Uryens while kneeling in a moat, was filmed in Cahir Castle, in Cahir County Tipperary, the Republic of Ireland, a well-preserved Irish castle. The castle's moat is the River Suir which flows around it. The fight with Lancelot was filmed at Powerscourt Estate's waterfall. Other locations included Wicklow Head as the backdrop to the battle over Tintagel, the Kerry coast as the place from which Arthur sails to Avalon, and a place called Childers Wood near Roundwood, County Wicklow, where Arthur comes on Excalibur in the stone.  At the time, John Boorman was living just a few miles down the road, at Annamoe. According to Boorman, the love scene between Lancelot and Guenevere in the forest was filmed on a very cold night, but Nicholas Clay and Cherie Lunghi performed the scene nude anyway.

According to Boorman, the film was originally three hours long; among the scenes that were deleted from the finished film, but featured in one of the promotional trailers, was a sequence where Lancelot rescued Guenevere from a forest bandit.

Release
When first released in the United Kingdom in 1981, the film ran to 140m 30s, and was classified as a "AA" by the BBFC, restricting it to those aged 14 and over. In 1982, the BBFC replaced the "AA" certificate with the higher age-specific "15", which was also applied to Excalibur when released on home video. The 140-minute version was initially released in the United States with an R-rating. Distributors later announced a 119m PG-rated version, with less graphic sex and violence, but it was not widely released. When Excalibur first premiered on HBO in 1982, the R-rated version was shown in the evening and the PG-rated version was shown during the daytime, following the then-current rule of HBO only showing R-rated films during the evening hours.

Reception
 Excalibur was the number one film during its opening weekend of 10–12 April 1981, eventually earning $34,967,437 in the United States. On Rotten Tomatoes it has a 73% "Certified fresh" rating based on 90 reviews. On Metacritic it has a score of 56% based on reviews from 10 critics.

Roger Ebert called it both a "wondrous vision" and "a mess." Elaborating further, Ebert wrote that the film was "a record of the comings and goings of arbitrary, inconsistent, shadowy figures who are not heroes but simply giants run amok. Still, it's wonderful to look at." Vincent Canby wrote that while Boorman took Arthurian myths seriously, "he has used them with a pretentiousness that obscures his vision." In her review in The New Yorker, Pauline Kael wrote that the film had its own "crazy integrity", adding that the imagery was "impassioned" with a "hypnotic quality". According to her, the dialogue was "near-atrocious". She concluded by writing that "Excalibur is all images flashing by... We miss the dramatic intensity that we expect the stories to have, but there's always something to look at."

Others have praised the entire film, with Variety calling it "a near-perfect blend of action, romance, fantasy and philosophy". Sean Axmaker of Parallax View wrote "John Boorman's magnificent and magical Excalibur is, to my mind, the greatest and the richest of screen incarnation of the oft-told tale." In a later review upon the film's DVD release, Salon's David Lazarus noted the film's contribution to the fantasy genre, stating that it was "a lush retelling of the King Arthur legend that sets a high-water mark among sword-and-sorcery movies." A study by Jean-Marc Elsholz demonstrates how closely the film Excalibur was inspired by the Arthurian romance tradition and its intersections with medieval theories of light, most particularly in the aesthetic/visual narrative of Boorman's film rather than in its plot alone.

Christopher John reviewed Excalibur in Ares Magazine #9 and commented that "Excalibur is a shockingly large film and an incredibly intricate and fascinating piece of cinema. It is a fine prologue for the spate of fantasy films waiting in the wings for release this year." The film featured many actors early in their careers who later became very well-known, including Helen Mirren, Patrick Stewart, Liam Neeson, Gabriel Byrne, and Ciarán Hinds. For his performance as Merlin, Nicol Williamson received widespread acclaim. The Times in 1981 wrote: "The actors are led by Williamson's witty and perceptive Merlin, missed every time he's offscreen".

Awards and nominations

Legacy 
The comedic 1989 teaser trailer for Leatherface: The Texas Chainsaw Massacre III directly parodies the lady of the lake scene from Excalibur.

In 2009, filmmaker Zack Snyder said Excalibur was his favorite film, calling it "the perfect meeting of movies and mythology". His superhero film Batman v Superman features homages to the film.

Documentaries
Neil Jordan directed a 1981 documentary on the making of Excalibur, entitled The Making of Excalibur: Myth Into Movie. 
In 2013 another documentary entitled Behind the Sword in the Stone was released featuring interviews with director Boorman and many of the cast, such as Terry, Mirren, Stewart, Neeson, Byrne, Lunghi, and Charley Boorman. Distribution rights were later acquired by PBS International, and the title was changed to Excalibur: Behind the Movie. As of June 2020, this documentary was made available in the United States through various online streaming services.

See also

 List of American films of 1981
 Excalibur, King Arthur's sword, the central symbol of kingship for Malory and the film
 List of films based on Arthurian legend
 List of sword and sorcery films

References

External links

 
 
 
 

1981 films
1981 fantasy films
American adventure films
American coming-of-age films
American epic films
American fantasy films
Adultery in films
Arthurian films
British adventure films
British coming-of-age films
British epic films
British fantasy films
Epic fantasy films
Films about orphans
Films about royalty
Films about witchcraft
Films about wizards
Films based on poems
Films directed by John Boorman
Films scored by Trevor Jones
Films set in Ireland
Films set in the Middle Ages
Films shot in Ireland
Films shot in the Republic of Ireland
Films about the Holy Grail
Incest in film
Matricide in fiction
American sword and sorcery films
Orion Pictures films
Warner Bros. films
Films based on works by Chrétien de Troyes
Films set in castles
1980s English-language films
1980s American films
1980s British films